Monika Pflug (born 1 March 1954), also known as Monika Holzner-Pflug and Monika Gawenus-Pflug, is a former speed skater from Germany. She was born in Munich and competed for West Germany.

Pflug's talent for speed skating was discovered in 1968 and the very next year, she already became junior national champion. In 1970, she set a national record on the 1000 m and in 1971, she became national sprint champion. The next year, 1972, was her best year; she first became national allround champion, then, one month later, she won gold on the 1000 m at the 1972 Winter Olympics of Sapporo, and two weeks after that, she became world sprint champion.

After getting married, Pflug started competing as Monika Holzner-Pflug in the 1974–75 season. The marriage was short-lived, however, and after her divorce she competed as Monika Pflug again. In 1984, Pflug married fellow speed skater Fritz Gawenus, a multiple national champion. From then on, she competed as Monika Gawenus-Pflug.

Pflug would compete in a total of five Winter Olympics between 1972 and 1988, but did not win any more Olympic medals. At the World Sprint Championships, she won three more medals, all bronze, in 1973, 1974 and 1982. She interrupted her speed-skating career for a while to become a mother. Pflug ended her speed-skating career abruptly in 1988 after a new personal and national record on the 500 m in an otherwise disappointing season. By that time, she had gathered 16 national titles and had skated a national record 65 times.

Medals
An overview of medals won by Pflug at important championships she participated in, listing the years in which she won each:

World records
Over the course of her career, Pflug skated one world record:

Personal records
To put these personal records in perspective, the column WR lists the official world records on the dates that Pflug skated her personal records.

References

External links

 Monika Pflug at SkateResults.com
 Monika Pflug from Deutsche Eisschnelllauf Gemeinschaft e.V. (the German Skating Association)
 Personal records from Jakub Majerski's Speedskating Database
 Historical World Records from the International Skating Union

1954 births
German female speed skaters
Speed skaters at the 1972 Winter Olympics
Speed skaters at the 1976 Winter Olympics
Speed skaters at the 1980 Winter Olympics
Speed skaters at the 1984 Winter Olympics
Speed skaters at the 1988 Winter Olympics
Olympic speed skaters of West Germany
Medalists at the 1972 Winter Olympics
Olympic medalists in speed skating
Olympic gold medalists for West Germany
Sportspeople from Munich
Living people